The Philippines–Vietnam relations refers to the bilateral relations of the Republic of the Philippines and the Socialist Republic of Vietnam. Since the end of the Cold War, relations between the two countries have warmed significantly. Vietnam is sometimes referred to as the only communist military ally of the Philippines. Both nations have cooperated in the fields of education, tourism, agriculture, aquaculture, trade, and defense. Additionally, both nations have similar positions on the South China Sea issue, with Vietnam backing the Philippine victory in the ICC against China, and the Philippines backing to a certain extent the claim of Vietnam in the Paracels. Both nations have overlapping claims in the Spratlys, but have never made military confrontations as both view each other as diplomatic allies and ASEAN brethren.

Early history 

Relations between the Philippines and Vietnam began centuries ago. There was proof that inhabitants of both countries were already involved in maritime trade prior to the arrival of Europeans. Ships from Luzon in the Philippine archipelago came to the great port of Vietnam in the Gulf of Tonkin to trade.

By 2000–1500 BC, Jade that was manufactured in the Philippines using raw materials from Taiwan, ended up in Vietnamese ports. Likewise, by 1000 BC, bronze drums from the Dong Son Culture in Hanoi, were exported to ports in the Philippines.

The Song dynasty's "The History of Song", show that the Filipino nation of Ma-i at Mindoro was a mere two days’ sail from Champa (A nation that once occupied central Vietnam) and that Champa’s and Mai’s merchants traded frequently with each other.

During 1000 AD, there was a commercial rivalry for Chinese trade between the Champa Civilization in Central and South Vietnam vs the Rajahnate of Butuan in Southern Philippines.

The Chams then migrated to the Sulu archipelago, home of the then Hindu would-be Sulu Sultanate. These Chams in southwestern Philippines were called Orang Dampuan. Champa and Sulu engaged in commerce with each other which resulted in merchant Chams settling in Sulu during the 10th-13th centuries. The Orang Dampuan were slaughtered by envious native Sulu Buranuns due to the wealth of the Orang Dampuan. The Buranun were then subjected to retaliatory slaughter by the Orang Dampuan. Harmonious commerce between Sulu and the Orang Dampuan was later restored. The Yakans were descendants of the Taguima-based Orang Dampuan who came to Sulu from Champa. Sulu received civilization in its Indic form from the Orang Dampuan.

During the transition from the Precolonial to Colonial eras, both the Philippines and Vietnam witnessed the actions of the Pirates of the South China Coast and how Fujianese pirates and Wokous from Japan intervened in the political, military and commercial affairs of the Vietnamese coast and Philippine archipelago.

Maritime trade relations were then disrupted with the conquest of the Philippines by the Spaniards in the 16th century and the conquest of Vietnam by the French in the 19th century.

The French occupation of Vietnam was successful partially because of assistance from Spanish-Philippines as soldiers from Spanish-Philippines which also included Mexican immigrants, were used by the French to augment the forces that invaded Saigon.

Philippine-Vietnam relations during the Cold War

The Philippines was initially aligned with South Vietnam and provided them humanitarian aid in the Vietnam War.

Before the Fall of Saigon, which preludes the disestablishment of South Vietnam, the Philippines was already preparing to establish relations with North Vietnam. President Marcos authorised his wife, First Lady Imelda Marcos, to make direct contacts while she was conducting state visits to Middle-eastern countries in early 1975. The communist takeover of Cambodia and the impending defeat of South Vietnamese forces led Manila to establish ties with Hanoi. The move was not seen as surprising as it was in line with Marcos' foreign policy to strengthen ties with socialist states in order to broaden economic and trade ties.

On July 9, 1976, Vietnam Deputy Foreign Minister Phan Hien arrived in Manila to discuss the formal establishment of ties between the two countries. On July 12, 1976, formal relations were finally established with the Philippines the fourth country in the ASEAN to establish relations with the Socialist Republic of Vietnam after Malaysia, Indonesia and Singapore. The Philippines and Vietnam opened their respective embassies in 1978.

Among the first problems to test the relation between the two countries was the repatriation of 14 Filipinos and 10 Vietnamese families who were still in Ho Chi Minh City, attempts of Vietnamese nationals to illegally enter the Philippines by claiming themselves to be members of Filipino families, and the involvement of Filipinos in the black market was received by the Philippine embassy. These issues hampered relations until the early 1980s.

Post-Cold War relations

Despite Vietnam's alignment with the Soviet Union and the Philippines with the United States during the Cold War, bilateral ties between the two countries can be recently described as friendly. On October 26, 2011, Vietnamese President Truong Tan Sang made a state visit to the Philippines where he met with his Filipino counterpart, President Benigno Aquino III. The two countries signed four agreements on naval, coast guard and tourism as part of the Philippine-Vietnam Action Plan 2011–2016 framework. A Memorandum of Understanding agreement supported information sharing between the Philippine Navy and the Vietnam People's Navy.

Both being victims of Typhoon Haiyan (though Vietnam was not as greatly affected as previously expected), the Vietnamese still donated to help the Philippines in its rehabilitation efforts after the natural disaster, through the Vietnam Red Cross Society.

South China Sea disputes 
The Philippines and Vietnam have territorial disputes over the Spratly Islands, among with Brunei, China, Malaysia, and Taiwan. The Philippines and Vietnam both disapprove of China's nine-dash map which China uses as justification for its claim in the South China Sea. Both countries were also committed to a multilateral diplomatic approach to the resolution of disputes in the South China Sea with the UNCLOS taken into account.

In December 2015, pirates believed to be from the Moro Pirates, rogue Muslim Filipinos wanted for war crimes in the Philippines, murdered a Vietnamese fisherman in the South China Sea, which sparked a strong protest from the Vietnamese side. The event also sparked outrage from the Philippine side, who was persecuting the wanted criminals who may have been influenced by Islamic terrorism. Both Vietnam and the Philippines have upheld a variety of international agreements against terrorism in the region.

In 2016, after a legal battle in The Hague, the International Court of Justice of the United Nations ruled in favor of all arguments of the Philippines against China's claims in the South China Sea, effectively nullifying China's claims in the international legal arena. However, China waived the international court's ruling despite being a signatory with respect to international laws and UNCLOS and sent more military vessels to the South China Sea, replacing corals reefs with man-made islands that house military bases and missile launchers. Vietnam formally supported the Philippines in its arbitration case against China regarding China's nine-dash claim over the South China Sea in the entirety of the case.

In August 2017, Vietnam pushed for the inclusion of a stronger statement against Chinese activities in the South China Sea.

In May 2019, after a Chinese vessel rammed and sank a civilian Filipino vessel and left 22 Filipino fishermen adrift and exposed to the elements, Vietnam sent a ship that successfully rescued the drowning Filipinos, gaining praise from the Philippine side.

Military ties 

A Memorandum of Understanding agreement supported information sharing between the Philippine Navy and the Vietnam People's Navy.

On November 23, 2014, two frigates from the Vietnamese People's Navy made its first port call to the Philippines. Vessels HQ-011 Dinh Tien Hoang and HQ-012 Ly Thai To docked at the Manila South Harbor for a goodwill visit which lasted three days. The move was initiated by former President Benigno Aquino.

Country comparison

References

 
Vietnam
Bilateral relations of Vietnam